Julian Holloway (born 24 June 1944) is a British actor. He is the son of comedy actor and singer Stanley Holloway and former chorus dancer and actress Violet Lane. He is the father of author and former model Sophie Dahl.

Early life
Holloway was born in Watlington, Oxfordshire, England on 24 June 1944. He was educated at Ludgrove School, Harrow School and the Royal Academy of Dramatic Art.

Career
In the 1962–63 television season of Our Man Higgins, Holloway was cast in his first major acting role as Quentin in four episodes.

He became a mainstay of the Carry On film franchise, appearing in eight films between 1967 and 1976, as well as one of the Carry On Christmas TV specials. 

In the 1970's British police drama The Sweeney, episode Big Spender, Holloway appeared as John Smith, the brains of an organized crime family who involve themselves with two dishonest employees of a car park company in an elaborate fraud.
 
His other television credits include the Uncle Silas television dramatisations, Elizabeth R, Remember WENN, Whatever Happened To The Likely Lads, Beverly Hills, 90210, Minder, The Professionals, The New Avengers, Z-Cars, The World of Wodehouse, and the Doctor Who story Survival in 1989. His films include Young Winston (1972), Porridge (1979), The Great Rock 'n' Roll Swindle (1980), A Christmas Carol (2009) and The Rum Diary (2011).

Holloway has developed a reputation as a successful voice actor / vocal artist, mainly in America. In 1991, he performed the part of Captain Zed in Captain Zed and the Zee Zone and as Bradford Milbanks in James Bond Jr.. He also voiced  Siegfried Fischbacher in Father of the Pride (2004), Prime Minister Almec in several episodes of Star Wars: The Clone Wars (2008-2020), and main antagonist Odlaw in Where's Waldo? (1991 series). Holloway has also performed as a vocal artist for video games including Pirates of the Caribbean: At World's End and Medal of Honor: European Assault. He also provides the voice for Death in the Cartoon Network animated series Regular Show (2010–2017).

Personal life
Holloway is the son of Stanley Holloway and his wife Violet Lane. In 1976, he had a brief relationship with Tessa Dahl, daughter of Patricia Neal and Roald Dahl. The relationship produced one daughter, the author and former model Sophie Dahl, who was born the following year.

In 1971, he married Zena Walker but divorced soon afterwards. In 1991 he met and married voice over artist and actress Debbie Wheeler. The marriage ended in divorce in 1996.

Holloway is a relative of the English architect and scenic designer Oliver Percy Bernard.

Filmography

Film

Television

Video games

References

Sources

External links
 

Living people
Alumni of RADA
British expatriate male actors in the United States
English male film actors
English male television actors
English male voice actors
Male actors from Los Angeles
People educated at Harrow School
1944 births
People from Watlington, Oxfordshire
People educated at Ludgrove School